Yu Seung-jin (born 20 January 1969) is a former South Korean field hockey player and currently a head coach. He competed at the 1988 Summer Olympics and the 1996 Summer Olympics.He is the head coach of Monarch Mart Padma.

References

External links

1969 births
Living people
South Korean male field hockey players
Olympic field hockey players of South Korea
Field hockey players at the 1988 Summer Olympics
Field hockey players at the 1996 Summer Olympics
Place of birth missing (living people)
Asian Games medalists in field hockey
Asian Games gold medalists for South Korea
Medalists at the 1986 Asian Games
Medalists at the 1994 Asian Games
Field hockey players at the 1986 Asian Games
Field hockey players at the 1994 Asian Games